Guichard is a French surname, and may refer to;

 Éric Guichard (born 1953), French cinematographer
 Étienne Guichard, French actor
 Jean Guichard (born 1952), French photographer
 Jorge Guichard, (1996-) Producer, and video editor
 Joseph Guichard (1806-1880), French impressionist painter
 Karl Gottlieb Guichard (1724-1775), German soldier and military writer
 Louis Pierre Guichard (1889–1986), French member of the resistance, mayor of the French city of Gargilesse-Dampierre.
 Olivier Guichard (1920–2004), French politician.
 Thor Guichard, French actor
 Xavier Guichard (1870-1947), French police detective and writer. He appears as a fictional character in works by Georges Simenon